Luohan (or "lohan" in older sources) is Chinese for arhat.

Luohan may also refer to:

 Luohan or Flowerhorn cichlid, a cichlid fish hybrid

See also
 Lohan (disambiguation)
 Yixian glazed pottery luohans
 Luohan quan, named after the Chinese word for arhat
 Luóhàn guǒ (arhat's fruit), the Chinese word for the fruit of Siraitia grosvenorii
 Luóhàn zhāi (vegetarian arhat), a Chinese dish also known as Buddha's delight